Sir Montague Shearman   (7 April 1857 – 6 January 1930) was an English judge and athlete.  He was a co-founder of the Amateur Athletics Association in 1880. The prejudice and contemporary misogyny he showed towards Edith Thompson, who was executed for conspiring to murder her husband, has been a source of controversy since her trial in 1922.

Early life 
Shearman was the second son of Montagu Shearman, a solicitor, from Wimbledon, Surrey and his wife Mary, née Catty. He was educated at Merchant Taylors School in the City of London, where he played association football, captaining the first XV in 1874–1875. He received a scholarship to St John's College, Oxford, taking a first in Classical Moderations and in Literae Humaniores.

Amateur athletics
He was a noted athlete, winning the one hundred yards race at the Oxford and Cambridge University Games in 1876, and was president of the Oxford University Athletics Club in 1878. He was also an accomplished rugby player, obtaining his "blue" as a forward and three-quarter in the university team from 1878 – 1880. Shearman was one of the founder members of the association, and served as the first honorary secretary from 1880 to 1883, then as vice-president until 1910. In that year he succeeded Lord Alverstone as president of the AAA. He was also a member of the Wanderers amateur football club.

Career

Legal
Shearman entered the Inner Temple as a student in 1877, and was called to the bar in 1881. He practised on the Midland Circuit for twenty-two years before "taking silk" to become a king's counsel in 1903. He was a specialist in common law and commercial cases.

Judicial
In May 1914, just months before the outbreak of the First World War, Shearman was appointed a judge of the King's Bench Division on the nomination of the Lord Chancellor, Lord Haldane, and was knighted. Along with Lord Hardinge and Sir Mackenzie Chalmers he conducted an official inquiry into the origin and causes of the "Sinn Fein Rebellion" of 1916.

Notable cases at which Shearman presided were the trial of Harold Greenwood at Carmarthen in 1920; of Edith Thompson and Frederick Bywaters; of the murderers of General Henry Wilson at the Central Criminal Court in 1922;  and of John Walter Knowles, also in 1922, for the "Tipton Catastrophe", a factory explosion which killed 19 teenaged girls, and which Shearman described as the worst case of manslaughter he had dealt with.

His role in the Thompson-Bywaters trial has been subject to controversy because of the prejudice he showed towards Edith Thompson, who had been charged as a co-conspirator in the murder of her husband by her lover, Freddy Bywaters. In his memoirs journalist and politician,  Beverley Baxter, referred to it as only being "in a nightmare that judicial killing was ever countenanced by a supposedly civilised people". He also described the trial as having the atmosphere of "the days of the Roman Empire when the Christians were thrown to the lions". Shearman was unequivocal about his views of the young woman when he told the jurors during his summing up (he would only call them all gentlemen despite there being two women on the jury) what he thought about Thompson's adultery: "I am certain that you, like any other right-minded person, will be filled with disgust at such a notion."

In 1925 Shearman became seriously ill, partly due to an old injury acquired on the football field. Following a medical operation, his speech was impaired, although he returned to work. He retired in October 1929.

Personal life
In 1884 he married Louise Long of New York, and they had two sons. His son, also called Montague Shearman (1886-1940), was a noted art collector, who assembled the Montague Shearman Collection, which contains such famous painters as Picasso, Dalí, Matisse, Utrillo, Sisley, Pissarro, Monet, Renoir, Lautrec, Rowlandson and many others.

The Burlington Magazine noted that the collection focusses on "themes with a clear relationship to comfortable middle-class life .. the satirical element never becoming obtrusive, and in the Lautrec having a distinctly moralising tendency. One wonders whether there was a reason in Shearman's taste for preferring a Renoir landscape to a figure subject - did he dislike Renoir's fleshy and voluptuous types ? - and one's suspicions are strengthened on noticing that the little group of Etty nude-studies are all back-views !"

Death
Shearman died at his London residence, Leigh House, 6 Eaton Gate, in January 1930, aged 72.

Books

.  (This book ran to five editions, and according to the Oxford Dictionary of National Biography  "stood the test of time for its comprehensiveness and for the quality of its writing")
 "New edition" (1888)
 Third edition (1893)
 Fourth edition (1894)
  (material from Athletics and Football: "issued separately, largely rewritten")

References

1857 births
1930 deaths
Queen's Bench Division judges
English sportswriters
Alumni of St John's College, Oxford
People educated at Merchant Taylors' School, Northwood
Members of the Inner Temple
Wanderers F.C. players
Members of the Privy Council of the United Kingdom
Knights Bachelor
Association footballers not categorized by position
English footballers